Myles Christian Turner (born March 24, 1996) is an American professional basketball player for the Indiana Pacers of the National Basketball Association (NBA). He played one season for the Texas Longhorns before declaring for the 2015 NBA draft and being selected by the Pacers with the 11th overall pick.

Early life
Turner was born in Bedford, Texas, to parents David and Mary Turner, and started playing basketball as a six-year-old. He attended Central Junior High School, and as a  freshman, he led his team to 27 wins.

High school career
Throughout high school, Turner played AAU basketball for the Texas Select team during the springs and summers to further develop himself and gain recognition as a player, participating in well known tournaments and camps such as the LeBron camp, the Nike Big Man Skills Academy, the NBPA Top 100 camp, Adidas Nations, and the Elite 24 invitational.

Between his sophomore and junior year, Turner, then 6'7", broke his ankle during the first spring game of AAU play, hurting his chances of recruitment, but soon recovered and gained some 30 pounds through two-a-day weight training regimen to improve his game.
 
In his junior year, after fully recovering, Turner averaged 15.7 points, 12.87 rebounds and 8.64 blocks per game, leading Trinity to a 17–13 record and reaching the state playoffs for the first time in 10 years, and only the ninth time in school history dating back to the school's establishment in 1968. He also accumulated six triple-doubles.

During the 2013 AAU summer circuit, Turner maintained his high level of production, leading his Texas Select team to the title at the 2013 Jayhawk Invitational in front of coaches from most of the Big 12 schools.

Going into his senior year, Turner began garnering nationwide attention and becoming a highly sought after recruit for his athleticism, ball handling, shooting ability, and natural shot blocking ability for someone of his height. He solidified that by finishing out his high school career with 18.1 points, 12.2 rebounds, 3.5 assists and 6.8 blocks per game, leading the Trojans to a 24–7 record.

After finishing off his senior year, Turner was one of the last highly sought after recruits left that were uncommitted. He was rated a five-star prospect by many sites including Rivals.com and several more college basketball analysts as well as being considered the No. 2 center in the nation behind Jahlil Okafor. Originally going into his senior year in fall of 2013, Turner had already accumulated 60 various offers, but by his senior year, the list was narrowed down to Texas, Kansas, Duke, Arizona, Kentucky, Ohio State and Oklahoma State. On April 30, 2014, live on ESPNU's Recruiting Insider, Turner formally announced his commitment to play basketball for the University of Texas.

Turner took part in the 2014 McDonald's All-American Boys Game, in which he recorded seven points and seven rebounds. He also represented the United States in the 2014 FIBA Americas Under-18 Championship, helping the country win a gold medal.

College career
As a freshman at Texas in 2014–15, Turner averaged 10.1 points, 6.5 rebounds and 2.6 blocks per game, earning 2015 Big 12 Freshman of the Year honors.

On March 30, 2015, Turner declared for the NBA draft, forgoing his final three years of college eligibility. In June 2015, Turner said, "The decision wasn't really that hard because I knew I would be picked pretty high, so I knew this was my opportunity to go."

Professional career

Indiana Pacers (2015–present)
Turner was selected by the Indiana Pacers with the 11th overall pick in the 2015 NBA draft. He missed 21 games between November 13 and December 28 of his rookie season after undergoing surgery to repair a fracture in his left thumb. On January 22, 2016, he scored a then career-high 31 points in a 122–110 loss to the Golden State Warriors. On March 3, he was named Eastern Conference Rookie of the Month for February after ranking third among East first-year players in scoring (13.4 ppg), rebounding (6.6 rpg) and minutes (29.8 mpg) during the month. On March 24, he recorded 24 points and a career-high 16 rebounds in a 92–84 win over the New Orleans Pelicans. Turner helped the Pacers reach to the playoffs as the seventh seed in the Eastern Conference with a 45–37 record, where they lost 4–3 to the Toronto Raptors in the first round. At the season's end, he earned NBA All-Rookie Second Team honors.
In the Pacers' season opener on October 26, 2016, Turner recorded 30 points and a career high-tying 16 rebounds in a 130–121 overtime win over the Dallas Mavericks. On December 15, he scored 26 points in a 102–95 loss to the New Orleans Pelicans. On March 26, he had 17 points and tied a career high with 16 rebounds in a 107–94 win over the Philadelphia 76ers.

Prior to the start of the 2017–18 season, Turner was elected team captain. In the Pacers' season opener on October 18, 2017, Turner had 21 points and 14 rebounds in a 140–131 win over the Brooklyn Nets. He missed the next eight games due to a concussion. On November 19, he scored a season-high 25 points against Miami Heat. Turner missed nine games in January with an injured right elbow. On March 13, he tied his season high with 25 points against the Philadelphia 76ers.

On October 15, 2018, Turner signed a four-year, $72 million contract extension with the Pacers. On October 29, in a 103–93 loss to the Portland Trail Blazers, Turner had three blocks to tie James Edwards (391) for number eight on the franchise's NBA career list. On December 10, he recorded a then season-high 26 points and 12 rebounds in a 109–101 win over the Washington Wizards. On December 23, he had 18 points and a career-high 17 rebounds in a 105–89 win over the Wizards. On March 5, he had a then career-high seven blocks in a 105–96 win over the Chicago Bulls. On March 18, he scored a season-high 28 points in a 106–98 loss to the Trail Blazers.

On February 25, 2020 Turner recorded a career-high eight blocks in a 119–80 win over the Charlotte Hornets.

On December 22, 2020, in the Pacers' season-opener, Turner matched a career-high eight blocks in a 121–107 win over the New York Knicks. On January 6, 2021, he recorded eight blocks again in a 114–107 win over the Houston Rockets. Turner finished the season with a league-leading 3.4 blocks per game.

On October 22, 2021, Turner recorded a career-high 40 points, along with five three-pointers, 10 rebounds, and three blocks in a 134–135 overtime loss to the Washington Wizards. On November 4, Turner scored 25 points while recording a career-high seven 3-pointers and grabbing 13 rebounds in a 111–98 victory against the New York Knicks. On January 28, 2022, he was ruled out for at least two weeks with a stress reaction in his left foot. On February 10, he was shut down through the All-Star break. On February 23, Turner was ruled out for multiple more weeks. On March 28, he was ruled out for the remainder of the season. He would have led the league in blocks had he played the necessary 58 games, and finished the season averaging 12.9 points, 7.1 rebounds, and 2.8 blocks per game in 42 games, while shooting 50.9 percent from the field and 33.3 percent from the three-point line.

On February 23, 2023, Turner tied a career-high 40 points on a career-high eight three-pointers made and also put up 10 rebounds in a 142–138 overtime loss to the Boston Celtics.

Career statistics

NBA

Regular season

|-
| style="text-align:left;"| 
| style="text-align:left;"| Indiana
| 60 || 30 || 22.8 || .498 || .214 || .727 || 5.5 || .7 || .4 || 1.4 || 10.3
|-
| style="text-align:left;"| 
| style="text-align:left;"| Indiana
| 81 || 81 || 31.4 || .511 || .348 || .809 || 7.3 || 1.3 || .9 || 2.1 || 14.5
|-
| style="text-align:left;"| 
| style="text-align:left;"| Indiana
| 65 || 62 || 28.2 || .479 || .357 || .777 || 6.4 || 1.3 || .6 || 1.8 || 12.7
|-
| style="text-align:left;"| 
| style="text-align:left;"| Indiana
| 74 || 74 || 28.6 || .487 || .388 || .736 || 7.2 || 1.6 || .8 || style="background:#cfecec;" | 2.7* || 13.3
|-
| style="text-align:left;"| 
| style="text-align:left;"| Indiana
| 62 || 62 || 29.5 || .457 || .344 || .751 || 6.6 || 1.2 || .7 || 2.1 || 12.1
|-
| style="text-align:left;"| 
| style="text-align:left;"| Indiana
| 47 || 47 || 31.0 || .477 || .335 || .782 || 6.5 || 1.0|| .9  || style="background:#cfecec;" |  3.4*  || 12.6
|-
| style="text-align:left;"| 
| style="text-align:left;"| Indiana
| 42 || 42 || 29.4 || .509 || .333 || .752 || 7.1 || 1.0 || .7 || 2.8 || 12.9
|- class="sortbottom"
| style="text-align:center;" colspan="2"| Career
| 431 || 398 || 28.7 || .489 || .349 || .768 || 6.7 || 1.2 || .7 || 2.3 || 12.7

Playoffs

|-
| style="text-align:left;"| 2016
| style="text-align:left;"| Indiana
| 7 || 4 || 28.1 || .465 || .000 || .667 || 6.4 || .4 || .3 || 3.3 || 10.3
|-
| style="text-align:left;"| 2017
| style="text-align:left;"| Indiana
| 4 || 4 || 33.3 || .432 || .000 || .625 || 6.8 || .8 || 1.8 || 1.3 || 10.8
|-
| style="text-align:left;"| 2018
| style="text-align:left;"| Indiana
| 7 || 7 || 28.0 || .611 || .462 || .789 || 5.1 || .6 || .3 || .6 || 12.4
|-
| style="text-align:left;"| 2019
| style="text-align:left;"| Indiana
| 4 || 4 || 31.5 || .400 || .214 || .615 || 6.3 || 1.5 || .0 || 1.8 || 9.8
|-
| style="text-align:left;"| 2020
| style="text-align:left;"| Indiana
| 4 || 4 || 36.5 || .568 || .429 || .438 || 10.8 || .8 || .5 || 4.0 || 15.8
|- class="sortbottom"
| style="text-align:center;" colspan="2"| Career
| 26 || 23 || 30.7 || .500 || .306 || .631 || 6.8 || .7 || .5 || 2.1 || 11.7

College

|-
| style="text-align:left;"| 2014–15
| style="text-align:left;"| Texas
| 34 || 7 || 22.2 || .455 || .274 || .839 || 6.5 || .6 || .3 || 2.6 || 10.1

Personal life
During his own time, Turner enjoys building Lego sets and practicing yoga.

References

External links

Texas Longhorns bio

1996 births
Living people
African-American basketball players
American men's basketball players
Basketball players from Texas
Centers (basketball)
Indiana Pacers draft picks
Indiana Pacers players
McDonald's High School All-Americans
Parade High School All-Americans (boys' basketball)
People from Bedford, Texas
Power forwards (basketball)
Texas Longhorns men's basketball players
United States men's national basketball team players
2019 FIBA Basketball World Cup players
21st-century African-American sportspeople